Thomas Colshill (c. 1518 – 1595), of London, Hackney, Middlesex and Chigwell, Essex, was an English politician.

Family
Colshill was the son of William Colshill and the brother of the MP, Robert Colshill. He married Mary Crafford, and they had three daughters.

Career
He was a Member (MP) of the Parliament of England for Knaresborough in 1558 and for Aylesbury in 1563.

References

1518 births
1595 deaths
People from Hackney Central
People from Chigwell
English MPs 1558
English MPs 1563–1567